Valea Laptelui River may refer to:

 Valea Laptelui, a tributary of the Crișul Alb in Hunedoara County, Romania
 Valea Laptelui, a tributary of the river Sebeș in Brașov County, Romania